Carychium tridentatum is a species of minute air-breathing land snail, a terrestrial pulmonate gastropod mollusk in the family Ellobiidae.

Description
The shell is 1.8-2.3 mm high  x 0.8-0.9mm. wide. The shell is more slender than that of  Carychium minimum. If the last whorl above the aperture is opened this shows the parietalis (a spiral ridge on the parietal region projecting into the interior of the shell) descending in a characteristic double curve (see figure below).

Distribution 
This species occurs in European countries and islands the Mediterranean, the Caucasus region and North Africa. It is
recorded from Siberia as Carychium striolatum J.R. Bourguignat, 1857 (synonym)

The European countries include:
 Belgium
 Bulgaria
 Czech Republic
 Netherlands
 Poland
 Slovakia
 Great Britain
 Ireland
 Ukraine
Albania, Andorra, Austria, Azores, Belarus, Bulgaria, Channel Islands
, Croatia, Denmark, Estonia, Finland, France, Germany, Greece, Hungary, 	
Italy, Kaliningrad, Latvia, Liechtenstein, Lithuania, Luxembourg, Madeira, Moldova, Montenegro, Norway, Romania, Serbia, Slovenia, 	
Spain, Sweden, Switzerland.

It has been introduced to North America, including to:
 British Columbia, Canada

References

External links
Carychium tridentatum at Animalbase
MolluscIreland

Ellobiidae
Gastropods described in 1826